Kalamandalam Sankaran Embranthiri (1944–2007) was one of the most popular Kathakali musicians, credited with initiating a new wave in the rendition of songs for the classical dance-drama from Kerala in south India. His shruti-aligned music was glistened by a velvety voice, easy reach of the three octaves and command over stage proceedings that won him massive fan following even as his form received an abrupt setback in 1990 when he suffered a major ailment from which he could never recover fully.

Biography

Early life 
Embranthiri was born in a poor Brahmin family in Vellayoor village of Malappuram district in Malabar. After completing his schooling, during which he learnt classical Carnatic music from a local teacher named Govinda Pisarody, teenaged Sankaran joined Kerala Kalamandalam in 1958. Madambi Subrahmanian Namboothiri, Kalamandalam Tirur Nambissan and Kalamandalam Hyderali joined Kalamandalam in the same year. His Kathakali music tutors at the institution were Kalamandalam Neelakantan Nambisan, Kalamandalam Gangadharan, Sivaraman Nair and Madhava Panikkar.

Embranthiri wasn't a particularly promising singer during his student days, but soon after completing his training at Kalamandalam began getting noticed for his sweet, emotion-laden voice and clear diction. Just as he started finding stages in the southern Travancore region, he got employed—first in the Irinjalakuda-based Unnayi Varrier Smaraka Kalanilayam in 1965 and later, in 1970, at FACT Kathakali School near Kochi from where he eventually retired as a Kathakali music teacher.

Career 
Embranthiri rose to professional prominence in early 1970s by updating himself on its voice culture that suited the general aesthetics of the times. His singing had a charismatic appeal that earned him admirers from the mass and the class alike. This, coupled with his ability to anchor the show as the lead musician (ponnani bhagavatar), won the trust of masters like Kalamandalam Krishnan Nair, Kalamandalam Gopi, Kalamandalam Ramankutty Nair and Kottakkal Sivaraman.

Embranthiri's novel rendition style inspired several of his contemporary singers, chiefly Kalamandalam Hyderali and Venmani Kalamandalam Haridas. In Haridas, he found a perfect cueist singer (sinkiti), taking him under his wings soon after Haridas made a comeback to Kathakali after a decade-old break from the art form.

In August 1990, Embranthiri fell seriously ill, necessitating a kidney transplant the following year. He did return to Kathakali circuit months later but seldom rose to his vintage form. Acute diabetes led to amputation of his right leg less than a decade later, but a gritty and tenacious Embranthiri still chose to stay on as a singer, sitting on a wheelchair in one corner of the Kathakali stage.

Death 
Embranthiri died on 13 November 2007, at a hospital in Aluva, off Kochi, near the house he built and had been living in during the autumn of his life. He is survived by his wife and two daughters.

Works 
Embranthiri, an ardent devotee of Lord Krishna at the famous Guruvayur temple, had made "Ajitha Hare" and "Pari Pahimaam Hare" his hit numbers among others. He also held several Kathakali Pada kacheris, or Kathakali song concerts (with instrumental support) without the dancers on stage. He was also party to many jugalbandi programmes, sharing the stage with Carnatic and Hindustani music exponents like Neyyattinkara Vasudevan, Sreevalsan J Menon and Ramesh Narayan.

Recognition 
Embranthiri was chosen for the prestigious Swathi Sangeetha Puraskaram in 2003, a year after he received the Kerala Sangeetha Nataka Akademi Fellowship.

References

1944 births
2007 deaths
20th-century Indian male classical singers
Kathakali exponents
Singers from Kerala
People from Malappuram district
Kidney transplant recipients
21st-century Indian male classical singers
Recipients of the Kerala Sangeetha Nataka Akademi Fellowship